Ornithinimicrobium is a Gram-positive, non-spore-forming and non-motile bacterial genus from the family Ornithinimicrobiaceae. The genus was formerly in the family Intrasporangiaceae, but later genomic data caused it to be reclassified in 2018.

References

Micrococcales
Bacteria genera